Johnnie & Joe were an American R&B vocal duo from The Bronx, New York, United States, who were best known for their 1957 hit "Over the Mountain; Across the Sea."

Johnnie Louise Richardson (June 29, 1935, Montgomery, Alabama - October 25, 1988, New York City) and Joe Rivers (March 20, 1937, Charleston, South Carolina) began singing together in 1957 and released several singles on Chess Records, which were leased from J & S Records, to whom the duo were under contract.  Richardson was the daughter of the J & S label owner, Zelma "Zell" Sanders, who had been a touring member of The Hearts.

Three of the songs hit the U.S. singles charts. "Over the Mountain, Across the Sea," written by Rex Garvin, went to #3 on the R&B chart and #8 on the Billboard Hot 100, and "I'll Be Spinning," written by Freddie Scott, went Top 10 R&B, both in 1957. "My Baby's Gone," a #15 R&B hit, was their last hit, although "Over the Mountain, Across the Sea" returned to the pop charts in 1960, peaking at #89 the second time around.

Richardson and Rivers resumed their professional partnership later in the 1960s. During the 1970s and '80s they performed in oldies concerts, and made a critically acclaimed album, Kingdom of Love, in 1982. Johnnie Richardson died of complications from a stroke in 1988.

References

External links
 Johnnie & Joe at Doo Wop Heaven
 Johnnie & Joe Biography
 Johnnie & Joe Discography
 Article and label shots

Musical groups from the Bronx
Chess Records artists